The Course were a dance music act from the Netherlands. It consisted of DJ/producer Vincent Hendriks and vocalists Dewi Lopulalan and Irma Derby. They achieved their biggest commercial success in 1997.

Hendriks and Lopulalan first met in 1990 at a DJ "mix championship" in the Netherlands. They met again in 1996, at the same venue, and the two decided to collaborate on some music.

The group released their first single, "Ready or Not", a dance cover of the 1996 song by The Fugees, in early 1997, with echoes of other contemporary hits Ultra Flava by Farley & Heller and Hold That Sucker Down by The OT Quartet. It reached #5 in the UK Singles Chart in April, giving the band their first hit. The follow-up, a cover of Chaka Khan and Rufus' "Ain't Nobody" also fared well, reaching #8 in July. However, their third single, "Best Love", only made it to #51 in December. Subsequent singles failed to see chart action, proving The Course to be a "two-hit wonder". They broke up in the late 1990s because of the lack of commercial success after the first two singles.

Albums

Singles

References
UK Singles Chart info from Official Charts Company

External links
The Course at last.fm
The Course at discogs.com

British dance music groups
Dutch dance music groups